Kathaleen Saint Jude McCormick (born 1979/1980) is an American lawyer and judge on the Delaware Court of Chancery, first as a vice chancellor from 2018 to 2021 and then as the current chancellor since 2021. She is the first female chancellor in Delaware history.

Career 
McCormick received a Bachelor of Arts degree in philosophy from Harvard University, and received her J.D. from Notre Dame Law School. She began her career as a legal aid lawyer. She then went into private practice at Wilmington law firm Young Conaway Stargatt & Taylor, where she became a partner. At Young Conaway, she specialized in corporate and alternative entity law.

In September 2018, Governor John Carney nominated Kathaleen McCormick and Morgan T. Zurn to two new vice-chancellor positions on the Delaware Court of Chancery. These appointments raised the total number of judges on the court from five to seven, the first such expansion since 1989. Carney noted that McCormick's experience would make her "an immediate asset to the court." She was confirmed by the Delaware Senate on October 3 and took office on November 1.

In April 2021, she was nominated by Delaware Governor John Carney as Chancellor of the Delaware Court of Chancery, following the mid-term resignation of the former Chancellor Andre Bouchard. The Delaware Senate confirmed McCormick, and she began her 12-year term on May 6. McCormick is the first woman to lead the court since it was established in 1792.

On July 13, 2022, McCormick was assigned the purchase agreement dispute case between Twitter, Inc. and Elon Musk, Twitter v. Musk.

References 

Delaware lawyers
Chancellors of Delaware
Vice Chancellors of Delaware
Notre Dame Law School alumni
Year of birth missing (living people)
Harvard College alumni
Living people